Hans Erich Baars-Lindner (9 December 1925 – 5 June 2014) was a German sailor who competed in the 1960 Summer Olympics.

References

External links
 
 
 

1925 births
2014 deaths
German male sailors (sport)
Olympic sailors of the United Team of Germany
Sailors at the 1960 Summer Olympics – 5.5 Metre